Woolton Hall is a former country house located in Woolton, a suburb of Liverpool, England. Built in 1704 and extensively renovated in 1772 by the influential architect Robert Adam, the building is praised as the finest example of Adam's work in the North of England. Throughout its first 200 years, the building was the residence of a number of notable figures, including the Earl of Sefton and Liverpool shipowner Frederick Richards Leyland.

During the 20th century, the building went through a number of uses, eventually becoming a school in the 1950s, and later being abandoned with plans for its demolition. A campaign against its destruction was successful and the hall was made a Grade I listed building in 1982. However, in 2021, the building was declared at "immediate risk" by Historic England.

History
Early records indicate that the land of Woolton Hall had been occupied since 1180 when the area of Much Woolton (now simply Woolton) came under the lordship of the holy Catholic order of the Knights Hospitaller who held the land for almost 360 years until the English Reformation. In the 16th century, Henry VIII's  dissolution of the monasteries suppressed the Knights Hospitaller leading the land being confiscated but then later restored by Mary I. The land was permanently confiscated from the order in 1559 under Elizabeth I and was kept by the crown until 1609. Eventually, the land came under ownership of the Brettarghs of Holt who were reputed to have acquired it from an ancient family named "de Woolton".

On the death of William Brettargh in 1609, the land was described as being home to a cottage. Sometime between 1700 and 1704, the house and surrounding estate was sold to politician Richard Molyneux, 1st Viscount Molyneux, who built the northern block of the hall.

In 1772, Woolton Hall was acquired by Nicholas Ashton, a former High Sheriff of Lancashire, whose father was one of the original undertakers and the principal financier of Sankey Canal, the first canal of the British industrial revolution. Shortly afterwards, Ashton commissioned the noted architect Robert Adam to remodel and expand the building extensively.

Nicholas Ashton died in 1833 leaving the house to his son Joseph Ashton who in turn left it to his son Charles Ellis Ashton. Charles Ellis later sold the house in 1865 to James Reddecliffe Jeffery who was the owner of Liverpool's largest department store, Compton House, located on Church Street. A fire at the store on 1 December 1865 destroyed much of Jeffery's uninsured stock, eventually leading to the business failing. Jeffery put the hall up for action in 1869 but failed to find a buyer until 1877 when Liverpool shipowner Frederick Richards Leyland purchased the house for £19,000, moving in with his family from nearby Speke Hall. Leyland, who was somewhat of an art enthusiast, decorated the house with paintings of varying styles including Edward Burne-Jones's Night and Day and Ford Madox Brown's The Entombment. Leyland later sold the building to the McGuffies, a family of shipowners who demolished the west wing and converted the remainder into a Hydropathic Hotel. After living there for some 30 years, the hotel closed in 1912.

After a short spell as the headquarters of the Middlesex Regiment and as an army hospital in the 1950s, the building was converted into a fee-paying girls' school under the management of the Convent of Notre Dame. In 1970, the small school merged with Notre Dame High School located on Mount Pleasant to form Notre Dame Woolton (now St Julie's Catholic High School). As the school expanded, new modern buildings were built nearby leading to Woolton Hall being abandoned.

Soon, the building fell into disrepair, eventually being marked for demolition in the 1980s. The building was saved after local resident John Hibbert purchased the Hall and spent £100,000 in refurbishments; soon after, on 28 June 1982, Woolton Hall become a Grade I listed building. In 2005, there were plans to convert the house into a retirement home and build 62 other new retirement flats on the grounds of the estate. In 2021, following years of stagnation, a major fire in 2019 and incidents of vandalism, the building was added to Historic England's "Heritage at Risk Register" as a category A site, the highest priority, meaning the building is at "immediate risk of further rapid deterioration or loss of fabric".

Ownership
 Molyneux family 1704–1766
 Ashton family 1772–1865
 Judge James Reddecliffe Jeffery 1865–1877
 Sir Frederick Leyland 1877–1898
 Captain Peter McGuffie  1902–1948
 Sisters of Notre Dame 1948–1970
 Mr J.B Hibbert & family 1980 – c.1985
 Jim Murray c.1985 - c.2005
 Jim Murray and Abid Chudary c.2005 - Present

Architecture

Exterior
From its outside, the slate roofed two-storey structure is built entirely of stone consisting of seven bay windows, two of which break forward under pediments. The windows, although now boarded up, have architraves and are sashed with glazing bars. The façade of the building was re-fronted in 1865 by Robert Adam to include a porte-cochère which covers the entrance. This consists of four paired Doric columns between rusticated antae, entablature and balustrade.

Interior

Passing through the front entrance is a large lobby flanked by two main halls. The lobby has marble flooring and an imposing oak fireplace which is one of the buildings original features, having been designed by Adam. Adjacent to the fireplace are three doors with the leftmost allowing access to a kitchen area and a stairwell. The door directly to the fireplace's left leads to an octagonal shaped turquoise room with and a decorated ceiling that contains a circular painting of Frederic Leighton's The Garden of the Hesperides. The door on the right leads to the building's main staircase.

Regarding the two main halls, the left side hall is a function room with two full-length windows, a stone set bar and fireplace and a back kitchen area. The hall's ceiling is decorated with painted with gold foliage centred around a bust of a man dressed in 18th-century clothing. On the right side of the building is a dance hall and adjoining tapestry room with high ceilings and oak panelled walls.
The dance hall with two large front facing windows is decorated with paintings of previous residents and a large painting of Queen Ann which sits above a brick fireplace. Next to this is a wooden bar area that leads into the tapestry room while at the room's centre is a parquet dance floor which has been damaged to reveal stone flooring underneath. The tapestry room is an elongated semi-circular area decorated with mostly Flemish paintings and two glass candle-style chandeliers. Set back to back with the dance hall's fireplace is another fireplace creating a mirror image, this time with a portrait of King George III hanging above.

The principal staircase which ascends to the second floor is another of Adam's original features consisting of wrought iron baluster and a moulded mahogany handrail. The upper floors boast large opens rooms with original Adam's ceilings, as well as many smaller rooms which have acted as bedrooms and classrooms throughout the hall's history.

Paintings
The hall contains a number of replica paintings including those of former residents; most of the originals have since been relocated to the Walker Art Gallery.

See also
Architecture of Liverpool
Grade I listed buildings in Liverpool
Other Grade II* or above listed buildings in Woolton:
Cedarwood
Much Woolton Old School
St. Peter's Church, Woolton

References

External links

Historic England - Woolton Hall

Grade I listed buildings in Liverpool
Country houses in Merseyside
Grade I listed houses
Unused buildings in Liverpool
Structures on the Heritage at Risk register